The 1988 Columbia Lions football team was an American football team that represented Columbia University during the 1988 NCAA Division I-AA football season. Columbia ended a five-year losing streak with two wins, and tied for next-to-last in the Ivy League. 

In their third and final season under head coach Larry McElreavy, the Lions compiled a 2–8 record and were outscored 303 to 140. John Alex was the team captain.  

The Lions' 2–5 conference record tied for sixth in the Ivy League standings. Columbia was outscored 177 to 103 by Ivy opponents. 

After losing all of their games in 1984, 1985, 1986 and 1987, Columbia entered the season on a 44-game winless streak, and 41-game loss streak, dating back to the 1983 season. Both were all-time NCAA Division I football records at the time. By registering a victory over Princeton in the fourth week of the 1988 season, Columbia ended the streak at 44 straight losses and 47 games without a win. 

Columbia played its homes games at Lawrence A. Wien Stadium in Upper Manhattan, in New York City.

Schedule

References

Columbia
Columbia Lions football seasons
Columbia Lions football